Live from Mars is a two disc live concert(s) release from Ben Harper & the Innocent Criminals, which takes tracks from unnamed venues throughout his 2000 tour and places them on either an electric (disc 1) or acoustic (disc 2) disc. It was released in the year 2001.

Cover Featuring
The album features three covers, which Harper often performs in concert:
 Marvin Gaye – "Sexual Healing"
 Led Zeppelin – "Whole Lotta Love"
 The Verve – "The Drugs Don't Work"

Track listing
All songs written by Ben Harper, except as noted.

Disc 1
"Glory & Consequence"
"Excuse Me Mr." (Ben Harper, Jean-Pierre Plunier)
"Alone"
"Sexual Healing" (Marvin Gaye, Odell Brown, David Ritz)
"Woman in You"
"Ground on Down"
"Steal My Kisses"
"Burn One Down"
"Mama's Got a Girlfriend"
"Welcome to the Cruel World"
"Forgiven"
"Faded/Whole Lotta Love" (Ben Harper/Jimmy Page, Robert Plant, John Bonham, John Paul Jones, Willie Dixon)

Disc 2
"Waiting on an Angel"
"Roses from My Friends"
"Power of the Gospel"
"Pleasure and Pain"
"Please Bleed"
"The Drugs Don't Work" (Richard Ashcroft)
"In the Lord's Arms"
"Not Fire, Not Ice"
"Beloved One"
"Number Three"
"Walk Away"
"Another Lonely Day"
"Like a King/I'll Rise" (Ben Harper/Maya Angelou, Ben Harper)

Charts

Weekly charts

Year-end charts

Certifications

References

Ben Harper albums
2001 live albums